Euler Renato Westphal (born July 2, 1957) is a university professor, writer and Lutheran theologian.

Biography
Dr. Westphal has a Bachelor's degree in Theology by Escola Superior de Teologia – EST (Higher School of Theology), also he studied in Missions Seminar St. Chrischona Pilgrim Mission (Basel, Switzerland – 1978–1982). He practiced pastoral work for eight years in Missão Evangélica União Cristã – MEUC(Evangelical Mission Christian Union) in Rio do Sul and Blumenau in Santa Catarina. He was also the founder of the Centro de Recuperação Nova Esperança – CERENE (Center for Recuperation New Hope) and of a social work turned to low budget families, the Bom Amigo (Good Friend), in Blumenau.

Since 1990, he has dedicated himself to full-time teaching at Faculdade Luterana de Teologia – FLT (Lutheran College of Theology) and at Universidade da Região de Joinville – UNIVILLE(University of the Region of Joinville). In 1997 acquired his Doctorate in Theology, in São Leopoldo, Rio Grande do Sul. He is professor of Systematic Theology in FLT. His works include researches on the philosophy of science and Protestant theology. Westphal is also a researcher in Bioethics, especially in UNIVILLE. He was also member in the advising group of IECLB's presidency from 2003 to 2010.

Dr. Westphal has experience in the theological area, with emphasis in Lutheran confession, and performing especially in the following themes: Protestant theology, ethics and bioethics, hermeneutics and cultural patrimony and society. He has five published works. The themes deal with Protestant theology, liberation theology and bioethics as well as in philosophy of science, contemporary thought and hermeneutics. He performs in the research lines of Patrimony and Sustainability of the Master’s in Cultural Patrimony and Society in UNIVILLE, Master's where he is also a professor at.

His research project is entitled “Epistemology of the Cultural Patrimony: hermeneutical aspects of the immateriality of the material patrimony”. He has 51 published texts in journals and magazines. Currently, he has various scientific articles and chapters of books published. Dr. Westphal accounts for various orientations of conclusions in graduation courses, of Master’s and co-orientations. He is a speaker of his researches’ themes. He is also part of the research group “Teologia Pública em Perspective Latino-Americana” (Public Theology in a Latin-American Perspective) from EST (Superior School of Theology), São Leopoldo, Rio Grande do Sul. In January and February 2012, he performed as guest professor in the Friedrich-Schiller-Universität (University of Jena) in the city of Jena, in Germany. The focus of his performing as professor consisted in approaches on theology, pedagogy and cultural anthropology. He performed in the College of Theology and of Social and Behavioral Sciences of Friedrich-Schiller-Universität in Jena.

Works
WESTPHAL, Euler Renato. Ciência e Bioética: um olhar teológico.  São Leopoldo: Sinodal, 2009. (Science and Bioethics: a theological perspective).
WESTPHAL, Euler Renato. Brincando no paraíso perdido: as estruturas religiosas da ciência. São Bento do Sul-SC: União Cristã, 2006. v. 1. 155 p. (Playing in the Lost Paradise: The Religious Structures of Science).
WESTPHAL, Euler Renato. Bioética; série Para entender. São Leopoldo: Sinodal, 2006.104 p. . (Bioethics; series "To understand").
 
WESTPHAL, Euler Renato. O Oitavo dia – na era da seleção artificial (The Eighth Day Review) . 1. ed. São Bento do Sul: União Cristã, 2004. v. 01. 125 p. . ( The Eighth Day in the Era of Artificial Selection–An Analysis about Post-Modern Thinking, Its Aesthetic Expressions and its Scientific Praxis).
WESTPHAL, Euler Renato. O Deus Cristão: Um estudo sobre a teologia trinitária de Leonardo Boff. 1. ed. São Leopoldo: Editora Sinodal, 2003. v. 1. 351 p. 
WESTPHAL, Euler Renato. Secularization, cultural heritage and the spirituality of the secular state between sacredness and secularization. 1Paderborn: Germany Ferdinand Schöningh, 2019. 119 p.

References

External links
 Euler Westphal publish "O Oitavo Dia" abording bioethical issues
 Bioetchis: IECLB may contribute with the first world churches 
 The term 'marriage' doesn't fit a homosexual relationship
 Books of Westpahl at National Library of Brazil

1957 births
Living people
21st-century Protestant theologians
Brazilian Lutheran theologians
Systematic theologians